Macromeracis is a genus of flies in the family Stratiomyidae.

Species
Macromeracis brasiliensis (Lindner, 1935)
Macromeracis elongata Aubertin, 1930
Macromeracis engeli (Lindner, 1943)
Macromeracis epsilon James, 1975
Macromeracis erecta James, 1975
Macromeracis hirtiforceps James, 1975
Macromeracis luteiventris (Philippi, 1865)
Macromeracis mima James, 1975
Macromeracis modesta (Philippi, 1865)
Macromeracis nana James, 1975
Macromeracis nordenholzi (Lindner, 1943)
Macromeracis penai James, 1975
Macromeracis philippii (Rondani, 1863)
Macromeracis plaumanni (Lindner, 1949)
Macromeracis reedi James, 1975
Macromeracis schlingeri James, 1975
Macromeracis similis (Enderlein, 1921)
Macromeracis thoracica (Philippi, 1865)
Macromeracis trigonifera James, 1975
Macromeracis viridiventris (Philippi, 1865)

References

Stratiomyidae
Brachycera genera
Taxa named by Günther Enderlein
Diptera of South America